Monastero di Santa Chiara is a church in San Marino. It belongs to the Roman Catholic Diocese of San Marino-Montefeltro. It was built in 1969 and consecrated in 1971.

Roman Catholic churches in San Marino
Roman Catholic churches completed in 1969
20th-century Roman Catholic church buildings